Central Medical Magnet High School (CMMHS) was a magnet high school in Beaumont, Texas. It was operated by the Beaumont Independent School District. The mascot was the jaguar.

History
CMMHS was established in 1986 by the merger of Beaumont Charlton-Pollard High School and French High School. In 2006 it received a medical magnet program.

In 2017 Hurricane Harvey (as Tropical Storm Harvey) hit the Beaumont area, damaging Central High's main building. The gymnasium remained open.

The school merged with Clifton J. Ozen High School in 2018 to form Beaumont United High School.

Athletics
Each year Central and Ozen had an athletic match, the Soul Bowl.
Central also had an athletic match with Westbrook HS, known as the Beaumont Bowl

Notable alumni 

 Michael Jacquet, football cornerback (Jacksonville Jaguars)
 PJ Locke, football safety (Denver Broncos)
 Brittney Rodriguez, actress (Red Rocket)

References

External links
 Central High School

1986 establishments in Texas
Educational institutions established in 1986
2018 disestablishments in Texas
Educational institutions disestablished in 2018
Beaumont Independent School District high schools